The Busch Family Brewed is an American reality television series that premiered on MTV on March 5, 2020. The series chronicles the lives of Billy Busch, great-grandson of Adolphus Busch; his wife Christi; and their seven children ranging in age from 28 to 13: Billy Jr., Haley, Abbey, Gussie, Grace, Maddie, and Peter.

Cast
Billy Busch Sr.
Christi Busch
Billy Busch Jr.
Haley Busch
Abbey Busch
Gussie Busch
Grace Busch
Maddie Busch
Peter Busch
Jake Fusia
Marissa Morgan
Clark Costello

Episodes

References

External links

2020 American television series debuts
2020s American reality television series
English-language television shows
MTV original programming
Television series about families
Television series by 51 Minds Entertainment